Joseph Bowman (7 November 1902 − August 1941) was an English footballer born in Evenwood, County Durham who played as a left back for Doncaster Rovers and Chesterfield. He played for Doncaster in the Third Division North between 1924 and 1932 and made 201 appearances in all competitions.

Bowman left to play for Chesterfield in League Division 2 in the 1931–32 season, making his debut at Tottenham Hotspur in a 3−3 draw on 13 February 1932. He appeared 31 times in total, playing his last first team game against Stoke City on 15 April 1933.

After Chesterfield, he moved into non-league football including playing for Broad Oaks Works. He died in 1941 at 38 years of age.

References

1902 births
1941 deaths
Footballers from County Durham
English footballers
Association football defenders
Doncaster Rovers F.C. players
Chesterfield F.C. players
English Football League players